Lucania goodei, the bluefin killifish, is a small species of fish in the topminnow family Fundulidae. It is native to the southeastern United States, but has been introduced to California, Texas and North Carolina. Other common names for the fish include Florida blue dace.

Distribution
The bluefin killifish is found throughout Florida, except for its panhandle, where it is not found west of the Choctawhatchee River. It is found in the Chipola River drainage of southeastern Alabama, and sporadically along the Atlantic coast up to central South Carolina. It has been introduced to Texas, North Carolina, and California.

Description
The maximum recorded age of the bluefin killifish is 2 years.

Ecology
Lucania goodei lives in heavily vegetated ponds and streams with little to no current. It is often found in spring habitats, and can also survive in moderate salinity, as well as low oxygen environments where it uses its upturned mouth to gulp air at the surface. Otherwise, it swims well below the surface. It is not a seasonal fish, unlike some other killifish.

Species naming
Lucania goodei was described by David Starr Jordan in 1880 with the type locality given as the Arlington River a tributary of St. John's River in Florida. The specific name honors the American ichthyologist George Brown Goode (1851-1896) who was the collector of the type.

See also
George Brown Goode

References

goodei
Endemic fauna of the United States
Freshwater fish of the United States
Fauna of the Southeastern United States
Freshwater fish of the Southeastern United States
Least concern biota of the United States
Taxa named by David Starr Jordan
Fish described in 1880